Stigmatorhynchus is a genus of plants in the  Apocynaceae, first described as a genus in 1913. It is native to Africa.

Species
 Stigmatorhynchus hereroensis Schltr. -  Damaraland region of Namibia
 Stigmatorhynchus steleostigma (K. Schum.) Schltr. -  Somalia
 Stigmatorhynchus umbelliferus (K. Schum.) Schltr. - Tanzania

References

Asclepiadoideae
Apocynaceae genera